Playa El Yaque (El Yaque Beach) is internationally known as one of the seven best locations in the world having ideal conditions for windsurfing and kitesurfing, attracting enthusiasts from all over the world, especially from Europe. It displays a row of hotels, shops and restaurants close to the beachfront, featuring a wide range of facilities and sport gear.

Location
The beach is located in the south side of Island of Margarita, Venezuela, about three kilometers away from the island's International Airport. The trade winds blow steadily at 15 to 30 knots during most of the year, and the shallow sea extends south of the beach for several hundred meters, allowing fallen windsurfers to stand on the flat sand bottom. As in most of the Caribbean, the water is usually between 21 and 27 °C, warm enough to allow windsurfing for hours wearing just a swimsuit or a bikini. On a typical day, up to one thousand windsurfers may be seen sailing at any given moment, along with practitioners of other similar water sports.

External links

 The Wind Map  
 Margarita Island Travel Guide

Beaches of Venezuela
Margarita Island
Geography of Nueva Esparta
Tourist attractions in Nueva Esparta